Teresin may refer to the following places:
Teresin, Kuyavian-Pomeranian Voivodeship (north-central Poland)
Teresin, Gmina Białopole in Lublin Voivodeship (east Poland)
Teresin, Gmina Leśniowice in Lublin Voivodeship (east Poland)
Teresin, Gmina Żmudź in Lublin Voivodeship (east Poland)
Teresin, Bełchatów County in Łódź Voivodeship (central Poland)
Teresin, Brzeziny County in Łódź Voivodeship (central Poland)
Teresin, Kutno County in Łódź Voivodeship (central Poland)
Teresin, Rawa County in Łódź Voivodeship (central Poland)
Teresin, Lesser Poland Voivodeship (south Poland)
Teresin, Otwock County in Masovian Voivodeship (east-central Poland)
Teresin, Sochaczew County in Masovian Voivodeship (east-central Poland)
Teresin, Greater Poland Voivodeship (west-central Poland)

See also 
 Terezín,  a town in Litoměřice District in the Ústí nad Labem Region of the Czech Republic